Too Hot to Handle is a Jorma Kaukonen acoustic solo album released on Relix Records. Kaukonen's wife at the time, Margareta Kaukonen, composed some of the tracks with him and is credited as "Malles Meje."

"Too Many Years" and "Ice Age" were later re-recorded with Jefferson Airplane for their eponymous reunion album. The former was again re-recorded for Kaukonen's 1998 album Too Many Years.

Track listing

Side A
"Broken Highway" (Malles Meje, Jorma Kaukonen) – 5:16
"Too Many Years" (Kaukonen) – 4:43
"Radical Sleep" (Meje, Kaukonen) – 4:13
"Killing Time in the Crystal City" (Kaukonen) – 6:44

Side B
"Ice Age" (Kaukonen) – 5:54
"Walkin' Blues" (Robert Johnson) – 3:37
"Death Don't Have No Mercy" (Rev. Gary Davis) – 6:22
"Too Hot to Handle" (Meje, Kaukonen) – 5:01

Personnel
Jorma Kaukonen – acoustic guitar, vocals

Notes and references

Jorma Kaukonen albums
1985 albums
Relix Records albums